Szekszárd is a district in south-eastern part of Tolna County. Szekszárd is also the name of the town where the district seat is found. The district is located in the Southern Transdanubia Statistical Region.

Geography 
Szekszárd District borders with Paks District and Tolna District to the north, Baja District (Bács-Kiskun County) to the east, Mohács District (Baranya County) to the south, Bonyhád District and Tamási District to the west. The number of the inhabited places in Szekszárd District is 17.

Municipalities 
The district has 1 urban county, 1 town, 1 large village and 14 villages.
(ordered by population, as of 1 January 2013)

The bolded municipalities are cities, italics municipality is large village.

See also
List of cities and towns in Hungary

References

External links
 Postal codes of the Szekszárd District

Districts in Tolna County